Richard Case Nagell (August 5, 1930 – November 1, 1995) was a United States Army veteran and former CIA double agent.   Nagell was arrested on September 20, 1963 after he entered the State National Bank in El Paso, Texas and fired two shots into the ceiling of the bank.  Nagel walked out of the bank after firing his weapon and sat down and waited for the police to arrive.   Dick Russell's biography of Nagell claims that Nagell had foreknowledge of the assassination of President John F. Kennedy.  According to Russell, Nagell also claimed to have gotten himself arrested in the El Paso bank shooting in late September 1963 to avoid becoming a patsy. Nagell met with New Orleans District Attorney Jim Garrison, who at the time was investigating Clay Shaw's possible complicity in the assassination.

Death
Nagell died from a heart attack on November 1, 1995, in Los Angeles, California, despite no history of heart problems. His death occurred one day after the Assassination Records Review Board had sent him a letter for information. He was 65 years old at the time of his death and is buried in Arlington National Cemetery.

Publications
 Man in the Middle: The Inside Story (What the Controlled Press and Official Reports Forgot to Mention). (Jan. 28, 1970).

References

Further reading
 Alderete, Joseph F. (Jun. 17, 1966). Report of Psychiatric Examination: Richard Case Nagell. U.S. Department of Justice, Bureau of Prisons.
 Russell, Dick (1992). The Man Who Knew Too Much. New York: Carrol & Graf. Foreword by Carl Oglesby. .

Staff writer (Dec. 30, 1995). "Passages: Richard Case Nagell" (obituary). Kennedy Assassination Chronicles, vol. 1, no. 4. p. 11.

External links
Richard Case Nagell in the Jim Garrison files
Richard Case Nagell in the Weisberg Collection
 Richard Case Nagell at Mary Ferrell Foundation
 Personal file at the Federal Bureau of Investigation

1930 births
1995 deaths
People associated with the assassination of John F. Kennedy